Parliamentary elections were held in Moldova on 6 March 2005. The result was a victory for the Party of Communists of the Republic of Moldova (PCRM), which won 56 of the 101 seats.

Electoral system
The Parliament was elected by proportional representation in a single national constituency. In 2002 the electoral law was amended to change the electoral threshold, which had previously been at 3% for independent candidates and 6% for political parties and electoral blocs. For electoral blocs of two parties it was raised to 9%, and for blocs of three or more, it was raised to 12%.

Results

See also
Moldovan Parliament 2005–2009

References

2005 elections in Moldova
Moldova
Parliamentary election
Parliamentary elections in Moldova
March 2005 events in Europe